Fernand Coulibaly  (born 1 August 1971) is a retired Malian professional football striker who played for several clubs in Europe and the Mali national football team. He has Turkish citizenship with the name Muhammed Doğan.

Coulibaly was born in Ségou. He played for Adana Demirspor, Gaziantepspor, Ankaragücü and Denizlispor in the Turkish Süper Lig. He also played for Stade Lavallois in the French Ligue 1.

He was included in the Mali national football team at the 1994 African Cup of Nations.

During October 2005, Coulibaly was imprisoned at the Bamako Central Prison following an investigation of his investments with the Banque l'Habitat Mali.

References

1971 births
Living people
People from Ségou
Association football forwards
Malian footballers
Mali international footballers
Malian expatriate footballers
1994 African Cup of Nations players
Stade Lavallois players
Ligue 1 players
Expatriate footballers in France
Expatriate footballers in Saudi Arabia
Adana Demirspor footballers
MKE Ankaragücü footballers
Gaziantepspor footballers
Denizlispor footballers
Diyarbakırspor footballers
Vanspor footballers
Süper Lig players
Malian expatriate sportspeople in France
Malian expatriate sportspeople in Saudi Arabia
Malian expatriate sportspeople in Turkey
Expatriate footballers in Turkey
Turkish people of Malian descent